Casey Warriors Rugby League Club are an Australian rugby league football club based in Clyde, Victoria formed in late 2013. They conduct teams for both junior and senior ≠—teams.

In 2016, the premier of reality television show The NRL Rookie showcased the skills of one of Casey junior products Drew Thornton chasing the dream of a NRL contract.

Notable Juniors 
Connor Donehue (2012- Brooklyn Kings)
Kelma Tuilagi (2021- West Tigers)

Other Juniors
Pride Petterson-Robati (2013-14 Melbourne Storm U20)
Connor Donehue (2015 Melbourne Storm U20)
Drew Thornton (2016 The NRL Rookie)

See also

Rugby league in Victoria

References

External links
 
 

Rugby league clubs in Melbourne
Rugby league teams in Victoria (Australia)
Rugby clubs established in 2013
2013 establishments in Australia
Sport in the City of Casey